Luke Lea (January 21, 1783 – June 17, 1851) was a two-term United States Representative from Tennessee.

Biography
Lea was born in Surry County, North Carolina, the son of the Reverend Luke and Elisabeth Wilson Lea. He moved with his parents in 1790 into what would become Hawkins County, Tennessee. He attended the common school, and as a young man he was a clerk for the Tennessee House of Representatives from 1804-06. He married Susan Wells McCormick on February 28, 1816, and they had nine children. He was also the great-grandfather of Luke Lea, founder of the Nashville Tennessean newspaper and a U.S. Senator from Tennessee from 1911-17. He owned slaves.

Career
After commanding a regiment under General Andrew Jackson in the Seminole and Creek War of 1818, Lee then moved to Campbells Station,  Knox County, Tennessee. He was elected as a Jacksonian to the 23rd Congress and re-elected as an Anti-Jacksonian to the 24th Congress. He served from March 4, 1833 to March 3, 1837.

He changed parties for his second term from Jacksonian to National Republican. He then served as Tennessee Secretary of State from 1837-39.

On September 9, 1850, Lea was appointed Indian agent by President Millard Fillmore for Fort Leavenworth, Kansas, and served in that capacity until his death the following year.

Death
Thrown from his horse on his way back to his residence near Fort Leavenworth, Lea died on June 17, 1851 at age 68. He was first interred at Westport Cemetery, Kansas City, Missouri; and is finally interred at Union Cemetery, Kansas City. 

Lea was the brother of Pryor Lea, a two-term Tennessee Congressman (1827–31), who was later a Texas state senator and a prominent Confederate supporter in Texas.

References

External links

1783 births
1851 deaths
People from Surry County, North Carolina
Jacksonian members of the United States House of Representatives from Tennessee
National Republican Party members of the United States House of Representatives from Tennessee
Tennessee Whigs
Secretaries of State of Tennessee
Clerks
American slave owners
People from Hawkins County, Tennessee
United States Army officers
Military personnel from North Carolina
American military personnel of the Indian Wars
Burials in Missouri